The 2016 Connecticut Democratic presidential primary were held on April 26 in the U.S. state of Connecticut as one of the Democratic Party's primaries ahead of the 2016 presidential election.

The Democratic Party's primaries in Delaware, Maryland, Pennsylvania and Rhode Island were held the same day, as are Republican primaries in the same five states, including their own Connecticut primary.

Clinton has many endorsements from the state's Congressional delegation, including the popular Senator Chris Murphy. Clinton campaigned to Sanders' left on gun control, which paid off for her with mothers in the wake of the Sandy Hook Elementary School Shooting.

Opinion polling

Results

Results by county

Analysis 
Clinton managed a five-point-win in Connecticut, a state she had narrowly lost to Barack Obama eight years earlier. She relied on turnout in larger cities, including Hartford (which she won 51-47), New Haven, and Bridgeport. She managed a large win in Greenwich, bolstered by support from more affluent Democrats and won in the New York City suburbs as a whole 59-40. Sanders held Clinton to a narrow margin statewide, thanks to his support in rural areas which he won 63-37.

In terms of demographics, Clinton won the African American vote 69-30, older voters 62-35, and the votes of women 57-41. Clinton also won women with children 55-44, and women without children 58-40. Sanders won the youth vote by an overwhelming margin of 66-34, the votes of men 55-43, and won the Caucasian vote (74% of the electorate) by a narrow 50-48 margin. Sanders won among voters with an income of less than 50k and 100k, with Clinton winning more affluent voters.

In terms of political ideology, Clinton won liberals 52-48 and moderates/conservatives 53-43. Clinton won Democrats 60-39 but lost self-identified independents to Sanders 74-23.

Clinton's stance on gun control resonated with voters in the wake of the Sandy Hook Elementary School Shooting in Newtown, Connecticut.

References

Connecticut
Democratic primary
2016